The Birmingham Astronomical Society was founded in 1977 in Birmingham, Alabama (USA), by amateur astronomers.  Monthly meetings are held at 7:00 p.m. at the Samford University Planetarium on the third Tuesday of each month. Monthly observing sessions (see star party), are held at dark sky site called Chandler Mountain (approximately 50 miles northeast of Birmingham) or at Oak Mountain State Park just south of Birmingham. There is also a Birmingham Astronomical Society based in the UK, which meets in the basement of Aston University, near Birmingham (UK) city centre every Wednesday evening at 7:30 p.m.

The club seeks to promote and educate the public about astronomy, as well as providing members with a meaningful opportunity to learn and observe on their own.

The clubs proximity to Huntsville and the Marshall Space Flight Center and United States Space & Rocket Center afford its members unique opportunities for education.

Events

In the spring of 2006 the club held its first annual Messier marathon, which is an all night observing session where members try to locate and document the entire Messier Catalog.
Members braved near freezing (or colder) temperatures and bitter winds, but the event was a great success.

Membership

According to the club website, "Membership in the Birmingham Astronomical Society is open to anyone with an interest in astronomy. You do not have to own a scope or have a knowledge of astronomy to enjoy the wonders of the night sky."

Publications

The club publishes a Quarterly Newsscope which is available on the website in pdf format. In addition they have a blog (located at http://www.bas-astro.com/blog)set up so members and non-members can discuss events of the day.

See also
 List of astronomical societies

External links
 Official site
 Official Blog site

Amateur astronomy
Amateur astronomy organizations
Astronomy in the United States
1977 establishments in Alabama
Organizations established in 1977
Science and technology in Alabama